During the 1983–84 English football season, Southampton competed in the Football League First Division.

Season summary
Southampton enjoyed their best season ever, achieving their highest-ever finish in the Football League of second, three points behind champions Liverpool. They also reached the FA Cup semifinal, only to be beaten by Everton.

First-team squad

Transfers

In
  Mark Dennis -  Birmingham City
  Ivan Golac -  FK Belasica
  Alan Curtis -  Swansea City
  Frank Worthington -  Sunderland
  Ken Armstrong -  Kilmarnock

Out
  Chris Nicholl -  Grimsby Town, August 1983
  Malcolm Waldron -  Burnley, £90,000, September 1983

Results

1st Division

References

Southampton F.C. seasons
Southampton F.C.